Slavnic can refer to:

Slavníč, a small village in the Czech Republic
Zoran Slavnić, a retired Serbian basketball player and coach